Richard McCallum may refer to:
 Richard McCallum (politician) (1863–1940), New Zealand politician
 Rick McCallum (born 1954), film producer
 Richard McCallum (footballer) (born 1984), Jamaican international footballer